is a Japanese footballer who is last down to have played for Goyo of the Mongolian Premier League in 2017.

Career

Singapore
Was released by Albirex Niigata Singapore at the end of 2013.

Cambodia
Contemporaneously served as player and coach of Albirex Niigata Phnom Penh in 2014.

Slovenia
Practiced with NK Bled of the Slovenian Third League and was a part of their defensive line at the beginning of 2017.

Mongolia
Snapped up by Goyo of the Mongolian Premier League in spring 2017, Sase split from them ahead of the 2018 season.

References

External links
 Japanese Wikipedia Page
 Tatsuya Sase at Soccerway

Association football defenders
Living people
1991 births
Association football people from Chiba Prefecture
Expatriate footballers in Singapore
Singapore Premier League players
Expatriate soccer players in Australia
Albirex Niigata Singapore FC players
Expatriate footballers in Cambodia
Expatriate footballers in Slovenia
Expatriate footballers in Mongolia
Japanese footballers